Border Troops may refer to:

Soviet Border Troops
Border Troops of the German Democratic Republic
Tajik Border Troops
Border Troops of the State Security Service of Uzbekistan
Border Protection Troops

See also
 Border Guard (disambiguation)
 Border Patrol (disambiguation)